Raphitoma histrix is an extinct species of sea snail, a marine gastropod mollusk in the family Raphitomidae.

Raphitoma histrix was first described as a fossil from the Pliocene of north-western Italy, though the name had also been used for shells from both the Mediterranean and western Africa.

Description

Distribution
Fossils of this marine species were found in Pliocene strata in Italy.

References

 Giannuzzi-Savelli R., Pusateri F. & Bartolini S. (2018). A revision of the Mediterranean Raphitomidae (Gastropoda: Conoidea) 5: loss of planktotrophy and pairs of species, with the description of four new species. Bollettino Malacologico. 54, supplement 11: 1-77

External links
  Bellardi L. (1847). Monografia delle Pleurotome fossili del Piemonte. Memorie della Reale Accademia delle Scienze di Torino. 9(2): 531-650, 4 pls

histrix
Gastropods described in 1847